Fritz Darges (8 February 1913 – 25 October 2009) was an Obersturmbannführer (lieutenant colonel) in the Waffen-SS during World War II who was awarded the Knight's Cross of the Iron Cross. He served as an adjutant to Martin Bormann and later was a personal adjutant to Adolf Hitler.

Early life
He was born in Dülseberg near Salzwedel. After attending school, Darges volunteered to join the SS in April 1933. By 1934 he had been selected to become an officer and attended the SS-Junkerschule at Bad Tölz. After graduation in April 1935 he was promoted to Untersturmführer (second lieutenant). In 1936 he was named Adjutant to Reichsleiter Martin Bormann. In May 1937 he joined the NSDAP (Nazi Party), and in September of that same year he was promoted to Obersturmführer (first lieutenant).

World War II
In October 1939 he returned to the Waffen-SS as a company commander in the Deutschland and Der Führer Regiments in the SS-VT. He fought in the Battle of France and was awarded the Iron Cross 2nd class in July 1940 and promoted to Hauptsturmführer (captain).

Darges was then posted to the newly formed SS Division Wiking, took part in Operation Barbarossa and was awarded the Iron Cross 1st class in August 1942. In March 1943 he became a personal adjutant to Adolf Hitler. He was assigned to the Führerbegleitkommando, an SS bodyguard unit that provided personal security for Hitler. He was promoted to Obersturmbannführer (lieutenant colonel) in January 1944.

Dismissal
On 18 July 1944, during a strategy conference at the Wolfsschanze, a fly began buzzing around the room, allegedly landing on Hitler's shoulder and on the surface of a map several times irritating Hitler. One version of the story states that Hitler ordered Darges to dispatch of the nuisance, Darges suggested that, as it was an airborne pest, the job should go to the Luftwaffe adjutant, Nicolaus von Below. Another version of this story states that Hitler noticed Darges grinning when he looked up from the map, while another claims he was snickering as Hitler looked up. Yet another version of Darges' dismissal and transfer by Hitler involves his refusal to marry Eva Braun's sister Gretl Braun, who was pregnant at the time. All versions state that Hitler took Darges aside, dismissed him on the spot and had him transferred to the Eastern Front.

Service in the Eastern Front
In August 1944 Darges returned to the SS Division Wiking to replace Johannes Mühlenkamp as the commander of the 5th SS Panzer Regiment. It was in command of this unit that Darges was awarded the Knight's Cross for his actions on the night of 4 January 1945. The division was advancing towards Bicske when it was stopped by the 41st Guards Rifle Division of the Soviet 4th Guards Army. Darges initially probed the Soviet line with a mixed Panzer and Panzer Grenadier Kampfgruppe and succeeded in breaking through the line at dawn. Subsequently he ambushed and destroyed a Soviet task force, knocking out four 122mm guns, four 76mm anti-tank guns, twelve trucks and a number of supply vehicles. He then attacked Regis Castle, forcing the garrison to retreat. Darges then found himself surrounded by Soviet reinforcements and was forced to repel several attacks. Three days later when they were relieved by another Kampfgruppe from SS Wiking, they left behind more than thirty destroyed Soviet tanks.

Post-war
Not much is known about his activities after Germany's surrender. He had a career as a car salesman after the war. He appeared in the 2000 documentary Hitlers Krieg im Osten, credited as himself.

Shortly before his death, Darges stated that he found Hitler to be a "genius" and that "I served him and would do it all again now." Darges authored a manuscript recounting his experiences as a member of Hitler's inner circle, with instructions that it be published after his death.

Notes

References

Further reading

External links
Fritz Darges' obituary 

1913 births
2009 deaths
People from Altmarkkreis Salzwedel
SS-Obersturmbannführer
Recipients of the Knight's Cross of the Iron Cross
People from the Province of Saxony
Waffen-SS personnel
Adjutants of Adolf Hitler
Martin Bormann
Military personnel from Saxony-Anhalt